Saburi Adesanya Addjimi is a Nigerian academic, author and the 7th substantive Vice-chancellor of the Olabisi Onabanjo University He was formerly the Acting Vice-Chancellor before being confirmed in 2015. He left the office in 2017 after five years of service.

Education 
Professor Adeyemi attended Baptist Grammar School, Ibadan between 1966 and 1970, he then proceeded to Igbobi College, Lagos from 1971 to 1972.
He afterward went to the University of Ibadan in 1973 where he bagged the Bachelor of Science Degree in Biochemistry in 1976. He again went to the Obafemi Awolowo University where he bagged the M.Phil. (Pharmacognosy) in 1981.

References

Living people
Nigerian writers
Nigerian male writers
Vice-Chancellors of Nigerian universities
Academic staff of Olabisi Onabanjo University
Obafemi Awolowo University alumni
University of Ibadan alumni
Year of birth missing (living people)